The 2016–17 Women's EHF Challenge Cup is the 20th edition of the European Handball Federation's third-tier competition for women's handball clubs, running from 15 October 2016.

Overview

Team allocation
TH: Title holders

Round and draw dates

All draws held at the European Handball Federation headquarters in Vienna, Austria.

Qualification stage

Round 2
Teams listed first played the first leg at home. Bolded teams qualified into round 3.

|}
Notes

a Both legs were hosted by Zagnosspor.

Round 3
Teams listed first played the first leg at home. Some teams agreed to play both matches in the same venue. Bolded teams qualified into last 16.

|}
Notes

a Both legs were hosted by Olympia HC.
b Both legs were hosted by Virto/Quintus.
c Both legs were hosted by Rocasa Gran Canaria ACE.
d Both legs were hosted by Jomi Salerno.
e Both legs were hosted by ABU Baku.
e Both legs were hosted by HC Mamuli.
e Both legs were hosted by Zagnosspor.
e Both legs were hosted by HC Karpaty.
e Both legs were hosted by KHF Shqiponja.
e Both legs were hosted by Mecalia Atlético Guardés.

Knockout stage

Last 16
Teams listed first played the first leg at home. Some teams agreed to play both matches in the same venue. Bolded teams qualified into quarterfinals.

|}
Notes
a Both legs were hosted by LK Zug.
b Both legs were hosted by Kram Start Elblag.
c Both legs were hosted by Haukar.

Quarterfinals
Teams listed first played the first leg at home. Bolded teams qualified into semifinals.

|}

Semifinals

|}
Notes
a Both legs were hosted by HC Lokomotiva  Zagreb.

Final

|}

See also
2016–17 Women's EHF Champions League
2016–17 Women's EHF Cup

Women's EHF Challenge Cup
EHF Challenge Cup
EHF Challenge Cup